Clipperton Island ( or) is an uninhabited,  coral atoll in the eastern Pacific Ocean. It is an overseas state private property of France under direct authority of the Minister of the Overseas. In the past, Clipperton Island was the subject of a sovereignty dispute in particular between France and Mexico, which was finally settled through arbitration in 1931; the Clipperton Island Case remains widely studied in international law textbooks.

Geography

Some consider it to be one of the eastern-most points of Oceania, rather than an outlying island of the Americas.

It is low-lying and largely barren, with some scattered grasses, and a few clumps of coconut palms (Cocos nucifera). The surrounding reef is exposed at low tide. The presence of this rock means that technically Clipperton is not an atoll but an island with a barrier reef.

Clipperton has had no permanent inhabitants since 1945. It is visited on occasion by fishermen, French Navy patrols, scientific researchers, film crews, and shipwreck survivors. It has become a popular site for transmissions by amateur radio operators.

Environment

Lagoon and climate
The water is described as being almost fresh at the surface, and highly eutrophic. Seaweed beds cover approximately 45 percent of the lagoon's surface.

While some sources have rated the lagoon water as non-potable, testimony from the crew of the tuna clipper M/V Monarch, stranded for 23 days in 1962 after their boat sank, indicates otherwise. Their report reveals that the lagoon water, while not tasting very good, was drinkable, though "muddy and dirty". Several of the castaways drank it, with no apparent ill effects.

Survivors of an ill-fated Mexican military colony in 1917 (see below) indicated that they were dependent upon rain for their water supply, catching it in old boats they used for this purpose. Aside from the lagoon and water caught from rain, no other freshwater sources are known to exist.

The rainy season occurs from May to October, when it is subject to tropical storms and hurricanes. Surrounding ocean waters are warm, pushed by equatorial and counter-equatorial currents. It has no known natural resources (its guano having been depleted early in the 20th century). Although 115 species of fish have been identified in nearby waters, the only economic activity in the area is tuna fishing.

Flora and fauna

When Snodgrass and Heller visited in 1898, they reported that "no land plant is native to the island". Historical accounts from 1711, 1825, and 1839 show a low grassy or suffrutescent (partially woody) flora. During Sachet's visit in 1958, the vegetation was found to consist of a sparse cover of spiny grass and low thickets, a creeping plant (Ipomoea spp.), and stands of coconut palm. This low-lying herbaceous flora seems to be a pioneer in nature, and most of it is believed to be composed of recently introduced species. Sachet suspected that Heliotropium curassavicum, and possibly Portulaca oleracea were native. Coconut palms and pigs were introduced in the 1890s by guano miners. The pigs reduced the crab population, which in turn allowed grassland to gradually cover about 80 percent of the land surface. The elimination of these pigs in 1958, the result of a personal project by Kenneth E. Stager, has caused most of this vegetation to disappear, as the population of land crabs (Johngarthia planata) has returned to millions. The result is virtually a sandy desert, with only 674 palms counted by Christian Jost during the 'Passion 2001' French mission, and five islets in the lagoon with grass that the terrestrial crabs cannot reach.

On the north-west side, the most abundant plant species are Cenchrus echinatus, Sida rhombifolia, and Corchorus aestuans. A unique feature is that the vegetation is arranged in parallel rows of species, with dense rows of taller species alternating with lower, more open vegetation. This was assumed to be a result of the phosphate mining method of trench-digging.

The only land animals known to exist are two species of reptiles (Gehyra insulensis, a gecko, and Emoia cyanura, a skink), bright-orange land crabs (Johngarthia planata, sometimes known as the 'Clipperton Crab', although it is also found on other islands in the eastern Pacific), birds, and rats. The rats probably arrived on large fishing boats that were wrecked on the island in 1999 and 2000. Bird species include white terns, masked boobies, sooty terns, brown boobies, brown noddies, black noddies, great frigatebirds, coots, martins (swallows), cuckoos, and yellow warblers. Ducks have been reported in the lagoon. The island has been identified as an Important Bird Area by BirdLife International because of the large breeding colony of masked boobies, with 110,000 individual birds recorded. The lagoon harbours millions of isopods, which are said to deliver an especially painful sting.

A 2005 report by the National Oceanic and Atmospheric Administrations (NOAA) Southwest Fisheries Science Center indicated that the increased rat presence had led to a decline in both crab and bird populations, causing a corresponding increase in both vegetation and coconut palms. This report urgently recommended eradication of rats, so that vegetation might be reduced, and the island might return to its 'pre-human' state.

History

Discovery and early claims

The island is believed to have been discovered by Spaniard Alvaro Saavedra Cerón on 15 November 1528. The expedition was commissioned by Hernán Cortés, the Spanish Conquistador in Mexico, to find a route to the Philippines. Others claim that Portuguese-born Spanish explorer Ferdinand Magellan was the first to find it in 1521, which would make Clipperton and certain islands of Micronesia the first areas of the Pacific to be reached by Europeans.

The island was rediscovered on Good Friday, 3 April 1711, by Frenchmen Martin de Chassiron and Michel Du Bocage, commanding the French ships La Princesse and La Découverte. It was given the name Île de la Passion (Passion Island); the date of rediscovery fell within Passiontide. They drew up the first map, and claimed the island for France. The first scientific expedition took place in 1725, under Frenchman M. Bocage, who lived on the island for several months. In 1858, France formally laid claim.

The current name comes from John Clipperton, an English pirate and privateer who fought the Spanish during the early 18th century, and who is said to have passed by the island. Some sources claim that he used it as a base for his raids on shipping.

Other claimants included the United States, whose American Guano Mining Company claimed it under the Guano Islands Act of 1856; Mexico also claimed it due to activities undertaken there as early as 1848–1849. On 17 November 1858 Emperor Napoleon III annexed it as part of the French colony of Tahiti. This did not settle the ownership question. On 24 November 1897, French naval authorities found three Americans working for the American Guano Company, who had raised the American flag. U.S. authorities denounced their act, assuring the French that they did not intend to assert American sovereignty. Mexico reasserted its claim late in the 19th century, and on 13 December 1897 sent the gunboat La Demócrata to occupy and annex it. A colony was established, and a series of military governors was posted, the last one being Ramón Arnaud (1906–1916).

Guano mining, Mexican colony, and evacuation of 1917

The British Pacific Island Company acquired the rights to guano deposits in 1906, and built a mining settlement in conjunction with the Mexican government. That same year, a lighthouse was erected, under the orders of President Porfirio Díaz. By 1914, around 100 people; men, women, and children, were living there, resupplied every two months by a ship from Acapulco. With the escalation of fighting in the Mexican Revolution, the regular resupply visits ceased, and the inhabitants were left to their own devices.

By 1917, all but one of the male inhabitants had died. Many had perished from scurvy, while others (including Captain Arnaud) died during an attempt to sail after a passing ship to fetch help. Lighthouse keeper Victoriano Álvarez was the last man on the island, together with 15 women and children. Álvarez proclaimed himself 'king', and began a campaign of rape and murder, before being killed by Tirza Rendón, who was his favourite victim. Almost immediately after Álvarez's death, four women and seven children, the last survivors, were picked up by the US Navy gunship  on 18 July 1917. No more attempts were made to colonise it, though it was briefly occupied during the 1930s and 1940s.

The story of the Mexican colony has been the subject of several novels, including Ivo Mansmann's Clipperton, Schicksale auf einer vergessenen Insel ('Clipperton, Destinies on a Forgotten Island') in German, Colombian writer Laura Restrepo's La Isla de la Pasión ('Passion Island') in Spanish, and Ana García Bergua's Isla de Bobos ('Island of Fools'), also in Spanish.

The history of the island and of Captain Ramón Arnaud was written by his niece Gabriela Arnaud; Clipperton, Una Historia de Honor y Gloria ('Clipperton, A History of Honour and Glory') in Spanish.

Final arbitration of ownership
France insisted on its ownership, and a lengthy diplomatic correspondence between Mexico and France led to the conclusion of a treaty on 2 March 1909, to seek binding international arbitration by King Victor Emmanuel III of Italy, with each nation promising to abide by his determination.

In 1931, King Victor Emmanuel III issued his arbitral decision in the Clipperton Island Case, declaring Clipperton to be a French possession.

Post-World War II developments
The island was abandoned by the end of World War II, after being briefly occupied by the US from 1944 to 1945. Since then, it has been visited by sports fishermen, patrols of the French Navy, and by Mexican tuna and shark fishermen. There have been infrequent scientific and amateur radio expeditions, and in 1978 Jacques-Yves Cousteau visited with his team of divers and a survivor from the 1917 evacuation, to film a television special called Clipperton: The Island that Time Forgot.

The island was visited by ornithologist Ken Stager of the Los Angeles County Museum in 1958. Appalled at the depredations visited by feral pigs upon the island's brown booby and masked booby colonies (reduced to 500 and 150 birds, respectively), Stager procured a shotgun and killed all 58 pigs. By 2003, the booby colonies had 25,000 brown boobies and 112,000 masked boobies, the world's second-largest brown booby colony, and its largest masked booby colony. In 1994, this story inspired Bernie Tershy and Don Croll, both Professors at UCSC's Long Marine Lab to found the non-profit Island Conservation  with the mission to prevent extinctions by removing invasive species from islands. 

When the independence of Algeria in 1962 threatened French nuclear testing sites in Algeria, the French Ministry of Defence considered Clipperton Island as a possible replacement. This was eventually ruled out, due to the island's hostile climate and remote location. The French explored reopening the lagoon and developing a harbour for trade and tourism during the 1970s, but this too was abandoned. An automatic weather installation was completed on 7 April 1980, with data collected by this station transmitted directly by satellite to Brittany.

In 1981, the Academy of Sciences for Overseas Territories recommended that the island have its own economic infrastructure, with an airstrip and a fishing port in the lagoon. This would mean opening up the lagoon by creating a passage in the atoll rim. For this purpose, an agreement was signed with the French government, represented by the High Commissioner for French Polynesia, whereby the island became French state property. In 1986, a meeting took place regarding the establishment of a permanent base for fishing, between the High Commissioner, and the survey firm for the development and exploitation of the island (SEDEIC). Taking into account the economic constraints, the distance from markets, and the small size of the atoll, nothing apart from preliminary studies was undertaken. All plans for development were abandoned. In the mid-1980s, the French government also began efforts to enlist citizens of French Polynesia to settle on Clipperton; these plans were ultimately abandoned as well.

Castaways
In early 1962, the island provided a home to nine crewmen of the sunken tuna clipper MV Monarch, stranded for 23 days from 6 February to 1 March. They reported that the lagoon water was drinkable, though they preferred to drink water from the coconuts they found. Unable to use any of the dilapidated buildings, they constructed a crude shelter from cement bags and tin salvaged from Quonset huts built by the American military 20 years earlier. Wood from the huts was used for firewood, and fish caught off the fringing reef combined with some potatoes and onions they had saved from their sinking vessel augmented the island's meager supply of coconuts. The crewmen reported that they tried eating bird's eggs, but found them to be rancid, and they decided after trying to cook a 'little black bird' that it did not have enough meat to make the effort worthwhile. Pigs had been eradicated, though the crewmen reported seeing their skeletons around the atoll. The crewmen were eventually discovered by another fishing boat, and rescued by the United States Navy destroyer USS Robison.

In 1988, five Mexican fishermen became lost at sea after a storm during their trip along the coast of Costa Rica. They drifted within sight of the island, but were unable to reach it. Steven Longbaugh and David Heritage, two American deckhands from a fishing boat based in California, were stranded for three weeks in 1998. They were rescued after rebuilding a survival radio, and using distress flares to signal for help.

21st century

The Mexican and French oceanographic expedition SURPACLIP, a joint undertaking by the  National Autonomous University of Mexico and the University of New Caledonia Nouméa, made extensive studies in 1997. In 2001, French geographer Christian Jost extended the 1997 studies through his French 'Passion 2001' expedition, explaining the evolution of the ecosystem, and releasing several papers, a video film, and a website. In 2003, Lance Milbrand stayed for 41 days on a National Geographic Society expedition, recording his adventure in video, photos, and a written diary (see links below).

A 2008 expedition from the University of Washington's School of Oceanography collected sediment cores from the lagoon, to study climate change over the last millennium.

On 21 February 2007, administration was transferred from the High Commissioner of the Republic in French Polynesia to the Minister of Overseas France.

In 2007, a recreational scuba diving expedition explored the reefs surrounding Clipperton, and compared the marine life with the reports of the Connie Limbaugh (Scripps) expeditions in 1956 and 1958. Recreational scuba diving expeditions are now made every spring.

During the night of 10 February 2010, the Sichem Osprey, a Maltese chemical tanker, ran aground en route from the Panama Canal to South Korea. The  ship contained xylene, a clear, flammable volatile liquid. All 19 crew members were reported safe, and the vessel reported no leaks. The vessel was re-floated on 6 March and returned to service.

In mid-March 2012, the crew from the Clipperton Project noted the widespread presence of refuse, particularly on the north-east shore, and around the Rock. Debris, including plastic bottles and containers, create a potentially harmful environment for its flora and fauna. This trash is common to only two beaches (North East and South West), and the rest of the island is fairly clean. Other refuse has been left after occupation by Americans 1944–1945, French 1966–1969, and the 2008 scientific expedition.

Amateur radio DX-peditions
The island has long been an attractive destination for amateur radio groups, due to its remoteness, the difficulty of landing, permit requirements, garish history, and interesting environment. While some radio operation was done ancillary to other expeditions, major DX-peditions include FO0XB (1978), FO0XX (1985), FO0CI (1992), FO0AAA (2000), and TX5C (2008).

One DX-pedition was the Cordell Expedition in March 2013 using the callsign TX5K, organised and led by Robert Schmieder. The project combined radio operations with selected scientific investigations. The team of 24 radio operators made more than 114,000 contacts, breaking the previous record of 75,000. The activity included extensive operation of the 6 meter band, including Earth–Moon–Earth communication (EME) or 'moonbounce' contacts. A notable accomplishment was the use of DXA, a real-time satellite-based online graphic radio log web page, that allowed anyone anywhere with a browser to see the radio activity. Scientific work carried out during the expedition included the first collection and identification of foraminifera, and extensive aerial imaging of the island using kite-borne cameras. The team included two scientists from the French-Polynesian University of Tahiti, and a TV crew from the French documentary television series Thalassa.

An April 2015 DX-pedition using callsign TX5P was conducted by Alain Duchauchoy, F6BFH, concurrent with the Passion 2015 scientific expedition to Clipperton Island, and engaging in research of Mexican use of the island during the early 1900s.

Postal code
The island is assigned with French postal code 98799. However, there is no post office on the island.

See also
Desert island
Lists of islands

References

Sources

External links

Isla Clipperton o 'Los náufragos mexicanos −1914/1917–'

Photo galleries
The first dive trip to Clipperton Island aboard the Nautilus Explorer — pictures taken during a 2007 visit
Clipperton Island 2008 — Flickr gallery containing 94 large photos from a 2008 visit
3D photos of Clipperton Island 2010 — 3D anaglyphs

Visits and expeditions
2000 DXpedition to Clipperton Island — website of a visit by amateur radio enthusiasts in 2000
Diving trips to Clipperton atoll — from NautilusExplorer.com

 
Overseas France
Coral reefs
Islands of Central America
Pacific islands claimed under the Guano Islands Act
Pacific Ocean atolls of France
Reefs of the Pacific Ocean
Dependent territories in North America
Dependent territories in Oceania
Arbitration cases
French colonization of the Americas
Former populated places in North America
Former populated places in Oceania
Territorial disputes of France
Territorial disputes of Mexico
1931 in Mexico
States and territories established in 1931
1931 establishments in the French colonial empire
1931 establishments in North America
Important Bird Areas of Overseas France
Seabird colonies
Tropical and subtropical grasslands, savannas, and shrublands
Ecoregions of Central America
Neotropical ecoregions
Uninhabited islands of France
Uninhabited islands of the Pacific Ocean
Former disputed islands
Important Bird Areas of Oceania
Tropical Eastern Pacific
Island restoration